Wiskala (also, Wis-kul-la and Wisoulla) is a former Awani settlement in Mariposa County, California. 

It was located at the foot of Royal Arches in Yosemite Valley.

References

Paiute villages
Former Native American populated places in the Sierra Nevada (United States)
Former settlements in Mariposa County, California
Yosemite National Park
Former Native American populated places in California